Matheus Mascarenhas dos Santos Raimundo (born 27 July 1998), commonly known as Matheus Mascarenhas, is a Brazilian footballer who plays as a left back for Liga I side FC U Craiova 1948.

International career
Matheus Mascarenhas represented Brazil at the 2015 South American Under-17 Football Championship.

Career statistics

Notes

Honours

Fluminense
 Campeonato Carioca runner-up: 2017, 2021

Brazil U17
 South American U-17 Championship: 2015

References

1998 births
Living people
Brazilian footballers
Brazilian expatriate footballers
Brazil youth international footballers
Association football defenders
Campeonato Brasileiro Série A players
Campeonato Brasileiro Série B players
Campeonato Brasileiro Série C players
Fluminense FC players
Botafogo Futebol Clube (SP) players
Atlético Clube Goianiense players
Sampaio Corrêa Futebol Clube players
Associação Desportiva Confiança players
Vitória S.C. players
Brazilian expatriate sportspeople in Portugal
Expatriate footballers in Portugal
Brazilian expatriate sportspeople in Romania
Expatriate footballers in Romania
Liga I players
FC U Craiova 1948 players
Sportspeople from Rio de Janeiro (state)
People from São João de Meriti